Guy IV may refer to:

 Guy IV of Spoleto (d. 897)
 Guy IV, Count of Saint-Pol (1254–1317)